MW Motorsport (formerly known as Matthew White Racing) is a motor-racing team that is competing in the Dunlop Super2 Series. The team currently races with Nissan Altimas, with Thomas Maxwell, Angelo Mouzouris, Tyler Everingham and Declan Fraser.

The team was formed by Matthew White in 2000 to further his own racing ambitions. Originally Matthew White Racing was a privateer V8 Supercar, specifically supporting White's career, but he took on a customer driver for the first time in 2002 and the team gradually changed over the next five years into a professional pay driver operation in the Fujitsu V8 Supercar Series. The team made infrequent appearances at V8 Supercar endurance races.

Kumho Tyre Series 
MW Motorsport first entered the Kumho Tyre Series in 2016, Running Garry Jacobson in an ex-FPR FG Falcon in rounds 4 & 5 of the series at Phillip Island and Sydney Motorsport Park. He would win all bar one race and finish sixth in the championship despite only competing in two rounds.

After taking a hiatus in 2017, the team would return for the 2018 season with first year drivers Zak Best and Tyler Everingham. the pair would finish 1–2 in the series with Everingham winning 10 races on his way to the series title.

For 2019 Best stayed with the team and was joined by Hamish Ribarits and Nic Carroll. Ribarits & Best would win races on their way to third and fourth in the series respectively. Carroll would finish sixth.

In the shortened 2020 series, Jaylyn Robotham would sign on for the two rounds contested. He would sweep the series, winning all four races and taking three out of four poles.

Super 2 Series 
The team's greatest success was in the 2009 Fujitsu V8 Supercar Series when Jonathon Webb won the series winning all but one race in the second half of the season.

For 2012 the team would run Luke Youlden as their only full-time driver, finishing fifth in the series. The other full-time car would be split between several drivers. Morgan Haber would be entered for the fourth round of the series in Ipswich.

In 2013 the team would run 3 full time cars, with Dale Wood & Morgan Haber entered for all rounds. Steve Owen would drive the third car for rounds 2 through 7 after Chaz Mostert was called up to the Supercars Championship after round 1. Wood would go on to win the championship with 3 race wins. Owen would finish sixth overall despite missing the first round, Haber would finish 24th.

For 2014 the team would only run one driver full time, Andre Heimgartner in the 28, with the other two cars being split between a variety of drivers. Steve Owen and Dean Fiore would score podiums in the single rounds they contested for the team. Heimgartner finished fifth overall.

In 2015 the team once again ran three cars, with two cars being run as MW Motorsport cars, driven by Jack Le Brocq, Chris Pither & Bryce Fullwood for the final round, and the third under the Super Black Racing name, driven by Simon Evans. Le Brocq would finish third in the final standings for the year, with Evans ninth.

2016 was a lean year for the team. Bryce Fullwood would be the team's only full-time entrant, with the 28 car being split between Chelsea Angelo and Jesse Dixon. Shae Davies would miss the final event at Homebush. The team only took two podiums all year.

For 2017, the team will switch to Nissan and run a pair of Nissan Altima Supercars for Shae Davies and Jack Le Brocq, although Bryce Fullwood will campaign an older generation Ford FG Falcon up until the Townsville round, where he is expected to upgrade to the COTF Nissan Altima. They will then become the first non-Holden or Ford Team in the series. Additionally the team entered Davies and Le Brocq in selected rounds of the 2017 Supercars Championship as wildcard entries.

In 2018 the team entered three Nissan Altima's for Dean Fiore, Garry Jacobson and Alex Rullo. All three drivers won races throughout the season. Jacobson and Rullo finished third and fourth respectively in the championship.

For 2019 the team welcomed back Bryce Fullwood, also running rookie Tyler Everingham and second year driver Zane Goddard. Fullwood dominated the series, winning six races and finishing off the podium only three times. Goddard finished fourth in the championship with Everingham seventh after winning in the wet at the Sandown round.

In 2020 the team entered a totally new lineup. Thomas Randle partnering rookies Jayden Ojeda and Zak Best, who moved up from MW Motorsport's Super3 program.

In 2021 the team scaled up to a Four Car Team with Jayden Ojeda staying with the team, Tyler Everingham returning to the team after one year with Anderson Motorsport, Josh Fife joins the team for his second year in the Super2 after leaving Brad Jones Racing and Declan Fraser who has graduated up to the Super2.

Results

Super 2 results

Car No. 28 results

Bathurst 1000 Results

Supercars Championship 
The team was granted a wildcard entry for the 2009 L&H 500 and 2009 Supercheap Auto Bathurst 1000. Brad Lowe and Damian Assaillit drove the car to a 23rd-place finish at Phillip Island. The pair would go on to finish 22nd at Bathurst.

The team would do the same in 2010, entering the L&H 500 & the Supercheap Auto Bathurst 1000, this time pairing Ant Pedersen with Damian Assailit. They would fare slightly better at Phillip Island, finishing 22nd, and slightly worse at Bathurst, finishing 26th.

The team planned to enter the endurance races again in 2011 however were unable to due to funding issues.

MW Motorsport would not attempt another wildcard until the 2017 Supercars Championship, in which they entered their Super 2 Drivers Shae Davies & Jack Le Brocq. Davies would contest the 5th round at Winton, Le Brocq the sixth at Hidden Valley. Both would enter the 8th round at Queensland Raceway, achieving modest results.

Drivers

Supercar Drivers

Super2 Drivers

 Matthew White (2002–2004, 2006–2008, 2010)
 Michael Turner (2002)
 Dean Wanless (2004–2006)
 Wayne Wakefield (2006)
 Marcus Marshall (2007, 2010)
 John McIntyre (2007)
 Geoff Emery (2007)
 Tim Slade (2007)
 Grant Denyer (2007–2008)
 Andy Knight (2008)
 Brad Lowe (2008–2009)
 Damian Assaillit (2008–2009)
 Jonathon Webb (2009)
 Matthew Hamilton (2010)
 Ant Pedersen (2010)
 Luke Youlden (2010, 2012)
 Ben Baker (2010)
 Tom Tweedie (2010–2011)
 Tony Bates (2010)
 David Russell (2010–2011)
 Tim Blanchard (2011–2012, 2014)
 Morgan Haber (2012–2014)
 Elliot Barbour (2012)
 Dale Wood  (2013)
 Chaz Mostert (2013)
 Steve Owen (2013–2014)
 Andre Heimgartner (2014)
 Ryan Simpson (2014)
 Dean Fiore (2014, 2018, 2022)
 Peter Rullo (2014)
 Kurt Kostecki (2014)
 Jack Le Brocq (2015, 2017)
 Chris Pither (2015)
 Bryce Fullwood (2015–2017, 2019)
 Simon Evans (2015)
 Shae Davies (2016–2017)
 Jesse Dixon (2016)
 Chelsea Angelo (2016)
 Alex Rullo (2018)
 Garry Jacobson (2018)
 Tyler Everingham (2019, 2021–2022)
 Zane Goddard (2019)
 Thomas Randle (2020)
 Jayden Ojeda (2020–2021)
 Zak Best (2020)
 Josh Fife (2021)
 Declan Fraser (2021)
 Thomas Maxwell (2022)
 Angelo Mouzouris (2022)
 Jaylyn Robotham (2023)

Super3 Drivers
 Morgan Haber (2012–2013)
 Matthew White (2013–2014)
 Peter Rullo (2013)
 Jack Le Brocq (2013)
 Ryan Cochrane (2014)
 Garry Jacobson (2016)
 Tyler Everingham (2018)
 Zak Best (2018–2019)
 Hamish Ribarits (2019)
 Nic Carroll (2019)

References

External links 

Supercars Championship teams
Australian auto racing teams
Sports teams in Victoria (Australia)
Auto racing teams established in 2000
2000 establishments in Australia